George R. Pfann (October 6, 1902 – December 17, 1996) was an American football player and coach.  He played college football at Cornell University, where he never lost while starring as a quarterback, twice named an All-American.  Before graduating from Cornell in 1924, Pfann also played on the lacrosse and basketball teams, and was elected to the Sphinx Head Society.  He then studied law at Cornell while serving as an assistant football coach and freshmen basketball coach.  Pfann completed his law degree at Brasenose College, Oxford as a Rhodes scholar.  From 1931 to 1935, Pfann was the head football coach at Swarthmore College, compiling a record of 8–26–1.  He was elected to the College Football Hall of Fame as a player in 1957.

Head coaching record

References

External links
 
 

1902 births
1996 deaths
American men's basketball players
Basketball coaches from Ohio
Basketball players from Ohio
Cornell Big Red football coaches
Cornell Big Red football players
Cornell Big Red men's basketball coaches
Cornell Big Red men's basketball players
Cornell Big Red men's lacrosse players
Swarthmore Garnet Tide football coaches
All-American college football players
College Football Hall of Fame inductees
20th-century American lawyers
United States Army personnel of World War II
American Rhodes Scholars
Cornell Law School alumni
Cornell Law School faculty
New York (state) lawyers
United States Army officers
Alumni of Brasenose College, Oxford
People from Marion, Ohio